Sweet Love may refer to:

 "Sweet Love" (Anita Baker song), 1985
 "Sweet Love" (Company of Strangers song), 1992
 "Sweet Love" (Chris Brown song), 2012
 "Sweet Love" (Commodores song), 1976